Cupanoscelis is a genus of beetles in the family Cerambycidae, containing the following species:

 Cupanoscelis clavipes Gounelle, 1909
 Cupanoscelis heteroclita Gounelle, 1909
 Cupanoscelis inermis Monné & Martins, 1992
 Cupanoscelis latitibialis Monné & Martins, 1992
 Cupanoscelis sanmartini Martins & Monné, 1975
 Cupanoscelis serrana Martins & Galileo, 1999

References

Eburiini